Pittosporum napaliense, the royal cheesewood, is a species of plant in the Pittosporaceae family. It is endemic to Hawaii, where it is known only from northwestern Kauai. It became a federally listed endangered species in 2010.

References

Endemic flora of Hawaii
napaliense
Endangered plants
Taxonomy articles created by Polbot